Diane Michelle is an American voice actress, famous for voicing Daisy Duck in several modern Disney projects such as The Spirit of Mickey, Mickey Mouse Works and Mickey's Once Upon a Christmas.

Early life
Michelle is a Southern California native and a graduate of the University of California, Santa Barbara.

Career
In 1984, Michelle formed the Goils, a group of three singers in World War II uniforms who emulate The Andrews Sisters but include jazz, swing, and popular tunes in their repertoire. The group has appeared on the Queen Mary in Long Beach, spent one year as resident performers at Las Vegas' New York, New York, and toured Japan four times.

She performs in many TV and radio commercials, including as the voice of Olive Oyl in commercials for Prego Spaghetti Sauce. Her numerous television V.O. credits include The Simpsons, Harvey Birdman, Attorney at Law (as Jane Jetson and Orbitty) and The West Wing. She has also done voices for many motion pictures, including RV (as the voice of the R.V.), Little Mermaid II and The Savages.  Michelle is the dubbed voice of Dianne Feinstein in the feature film Milk.

In 2002, Michelle launched a one-woman show at the world-famous Encounter Restaurant at LAX portraying the award-winning cartoon spaceship captain/diva Va Va LaVoom, her character from the Elmo Aardvark cartoon series.

Her voice work also appears in Happy Feet, Wings, Star Wars Galactic Battlegrounds, Francine Langstrom in Son of Batman, Crayon Shin-chan, and Kiki's Delivery Service (Streamline dub). Michelle has voiced multiple characters in video games such as The Amazing Spider-Man 2 (where she voiced Sally Field's rendition of Aunt May), Mass Effect, EverQuest II, and Diablo II.

Filmography

External links
 

Place of birth missing (living people)
Living people
American voice actresses
American video game actresses
University of California, Santa Barbara alumni
Actresses from California
20th-century American actresses
21st-century American actresses
Year of birth missing (living people)